The Gunman and Other Stories is the seventh studio album by the English pop band Prefab Sprout. Released in June 2001, the album was the band's only release for the EMI Liberty label.

Album history
Following 1997 album Andromeda Heights and 1999 compilation 38 Carat Collection, Prefab Sprout conducted their first tour of the UK for 10 years.  The success of the tour led singer and frontman Paddy McAloon to consider recording material for a new album. Rather than opting for "new" material, McAloon chose to record material he had previously given to other artists as a "tidying up operation", before moving on to newer material.

Despite drummer Neil Conti's involvement in the tour (having originally departed from the band in 1992), the studio band operated with McAloon and his brother Martin as sole members. Fellow singer Wendy Smith was absent due to having given birth the previous year, and other work commitments with her  music therapy career.

The album was produced by Tony Visconti, and made use of session musicians including Carlos Alomar, Jeff Pevar and Jordan Rudess. Eric Weissberg of "Duelling Banjos" fame, played the banjo on "Cowboy Dreams". Mixes were approved via e-mail between Visconti in New York and the McAloon brothers' base in County Durham.

The album included versions of five songs which Paddy McAloon originally wrote for other performers. "Cowboy Dreams", "I'm a Troubled Man", "Love Will Find Someone for You" and "Blue Roses" were originally recorded by Jimmy Nail in 1994 and 1996, respectively, while title track "The Gunman" was originally recorded by Cher on her 1995 album It's a Man's World.

The album was the least successful of the band's output, stalling at No. 60 in the UK Albums Chart.

One single was released from the album, "Wild Card in the Pack", in October 2001.

Track listing
All songs written by Paddy McAloon unless noted otherwise:

 "Cowboy Dreams" 
 "Wild Card in the Pack"
 "I'm a Troubled Man" 	
 "The Streets of Laredo" / "Not Long for This World" (traditional; arranged and adapted by Paddy McAloon/Paddy McAloon)
 "Love Will Find Someone for You" 
 "Cornfield Ablaze" 		
 "When You Get to Know Me Better"
 "The Gunman"
 "Blue Roses"
 "Farmyard Cat"

The Japanese CD release also featured the "Cowboy Dreams" video as a CD extra as well as footage of the music video shoot and liner notes by Paddy McAloon.

References

Prefab Sprout albums
2001 albums
Albums produced by Tony Visconti